The women's 60 metres hurdles at the 2018 IAAF World Indoor Championships took place on 2 and 3 March 2018.

Summary
Kendra Harrison came into these championships as the favorite based on her outdoor world record, but so far world championship medals have evaded her.  She dominated her way through the rounds.

In the final, Christina Manning got the best start along with Devynne Charlton, but Harrison quickly made up ground.  By the second hurdle, she had a foot (30 cm) lead, over the two, with Charlton fading from contention after that, while Sharika Nelvis and Isabelle Pedersen were the next back by the third hurdle.  Nadine Visser pulled even with Pedersen still 2 feet behind Nelvis.  Out front, Harrison had a metre lead over Manning.  On the run in, Harrison and Manning retained their positions, while Visser closed quickly to take bronze from Nelvis.  Seventh over the last barrier, Cindy Roleder also closed quickly to almost catch Nelvis for fourth.  Harrison's winning time of 7.70 was a new Championship record.

Results

Heats
The heats were started on 2 March at 18:05.

Semifinals
The semifinals started on 3 March at 18:05.

Final

The final was started on 3 March at 20:55.

References

60 metres hurdles
60 metres hurdles at the World Athletics Indoor Championships
2018 in women's athletics